"Swallowed" is a song by British alternative rock band Bush, released on 15 October 1996 as the lead single from the band's 1996 album, Razorblade Suitcase, which topped the US Billboard 200 chart. It was later included on the remix album Deconstructed, the live album Zen X Four, and the Bush greatest hits compilation. The release of "Swallowed" followed the fifth and final single off of the band's 1994 debut album Sixteen Stone, "Machinehead", by only six months.

Critical reception
British magazine Music Week rated the song four out of five, adding that "the successful British exports look set for their first big UK hit with this melodic cut." David Sinclair from The Times described it as "an undeniably catchy tune, once you get past the meaningless lyric and self-conscious Nirvana-isms."

Commercial performance
"Swallowed" was released as the lead single from the follow-up to their massively successful debut album, Sixteen Stone, which was released two years prior. Upon release, the song topped the Billboard Modern Rock Tracks chart for seven consecutive weeks and peaked at number 27 on the Billboard Hot 100 Airplay chart. This is the longest Bush ever stayed at number one on any chart. It was also Bush's biggest hit in their native Britain, where it peaked at number 7 in the UK Singles Chart. 
It was nominated for Best Hard Rock Performance at the 1998 Grammy Awards, but lost to the Smashing Pumpkins' "The End Is the Beginning Is the End". This was the band's third crossover hit to Top 40 radio after "Comedown" and "Glycerine".

Composition
A power ballad, the song is in A-flat major.

Gavin Rossdale opined in 1999 that, despite a musical dissimilarity, the song was "[his] version" of the Beatles' song "Help!".

Music video
The accompanying music video for "Swallowed", directed by Jamie Morgan, was filmed in October 1996 and released later that month, is set in a retro apartment with myriad alternative youths. A neon crucifix (which would later become the album cover for Deconstructed) is frequently interspersed amongst the antics of houseguests. The video was shot at Twickenham Studios England and in Florida.

The video was nominated for several MTV Video Music Awards.

American rock band Third Eye Blind opted to work with Jamie Morgan for their "Semi-Charmed Life" music video after seeing his work on "Swallowed".

Track listing
 UK CD single 1 IND95528
"Swallowed [Radio Edit]" - 4:08
 "Broken TV" - 4:28
 "Glycerine" - 4:26
 "In a Lonely Place" - 5:58 (Written by Ian Curtis/Peter Hook/Stephen Morris/Bernard Sumner) Produced by Tricky

 UK CD Single 2 INDX95528
 "Swallowed" [LP Version] - 4:53
 "Swallowed [Toasted Both Sides Please Goldie Remix]" - 5:50
 "Insect Kin [Live on Saturday Night Live]" - 4:09
 "Cold Contagious [16"oz Demo Version]" - 5:57

 AUS CD single IND95519 (Cardsleeve)
"Swallowed [Radio Edit]" - 4:22
 "Broken TV" - 4:28
 "Communicator" - 4:24
 "Glycerine [Live At Pinkpop, Holland]" - 4:42

Charts

Weekly charts

Year-end charts

References

External links
 

1996 songs
1996 singles
Bush (British band) songs
Grunge songs
Rock ballads
Song recordings produced by Steve Albini
Songs written by Gavin Rossdale
Interscope Records singles
Trauma Records singles